James Verner may refer to:
 James Verner (Irish parliamentarian) (1746–1822)
 James Verner, suspect in 1946 Georgia lynching